Kirksanton is a village on the A5093 road, in the Copeland district, in the county of Cumbria, England. Nearby settlements include the town of Millom, and the villages of Silecroft and Whicham.

In April 2009, Secretary of State for Energy and Climate Change Ed Miliband included Kirksanton in a list of eleven potential new nuclear power plants. The site was ruled out by the new Government's Energy Secretary Chris Huhne in October 2010 when the list of potential sites was reduced to eight, Braystones the only other potential new nuclear site at the time, was subsequently rejected also.

The village is located just outside the Lake District National Park.

Governance
Kirksanton is within the Copeland UK Parliamentary constituency, Trudy Harrison is the Member of parliament.

Before Brexit, it was in the North West England European Parliamentary Constituency.

For Local Government purposes it is in the Black Combe & Scafell ward of  the Borough of Copeland and Millom Without of Cumbria County Council.

Kirksanton does not have its own parish council; instead it's part of Whicham Parish Council.

References

External links
Cumbria County History Trust: Millom, Rural (nb: provisional research only – see Talk page)

Villages in Cumbria
Whicham